John William Farley is an American atomic physicist and an Emeritus Professor of Physics at the University of Nevada, Las Vegas, as well as the Southern Nevada district's representative to the American Association of Physics Teachers.

Education
Farley received his PhD from Columbia University in 1977. His doctoral advisor was William Happer. He taught physics at the University of Oregon until 1987 when he left Oregon to join the University of Nevada, Las Vegas (UNLV). At UNLV, he was also involved in the installation of Laser spectroscopy equipments with fellow physicist, Victor Kwong, in 1980s.

Research
Farley's primary research interest is the corrosion of steel by exposure to lead-bismuth eutectic. He has also conducted some research into molecular ions, and presented on this research at the International Symposium on Molecular Spectroscopy in 1999.

Views

Global warming
Farley has frequently spoken out about the need for society to take action to avoid dangerous climate change, such as by investing in renewable energy.

Power lines
Farley has contended that the proposed link between proximity to power lines and cancer is not supported by the preponderance of scientific evidence. He has also contended that magnetic fields in general have little, if any, effect on human health.

References

External links
Rabett Run, Farley's blog

Living people
21st-century American physicists
Columbia University alumni
University of Nevada, Las Vegas faculty
Environmental bloggers
American nuclear physicists
American environmentalists
Year of birth missing (living people)